The Morocco national under-17 football team is the national under-17 football team of Morocco and is controlled by the Royal Moroccan Football Federation. The team competes in the Africa U-17 Cup of Nations, UNAF U-17 Tournament and the FIFA U-17 World Cup, which is held every two years.

Honours 
 UNAF U-17 Tournament:
 Winners (4): 2007, 2011, 2018, 2022
 Runners-up (2): 2009 (Tunisia), 2014
 Third Place (4): 2008 (Tunisia), 2009 (Morocco), 2012 (Morocco), 2015

Tournament Records

CAF U-16 and U-17 World Cup Qualifiers record

FIFA U-16 and U-17 World Cup record

CAF U-17 Championship record

Arab Cup U-17 record

UNAF U-17 Tournament record 

 Red border color indicates tournament was held on home soil.
*Draws include knockout matches decided on penalty kicks.

2023 Africa U-17 Cup of Nations

Group B

Current squad
Squad for 2019 Africa U-17 Cup of Nations.

Head coach: Jamal Sellami

References

External links 
  Morocco under-17 football team - official site of RMFF

African national under-17 association football teams
under-17
Youth football in Morocco